The Dukou class is a class of little known dispatch boat (YFL) built in the People's Republic of China (PRC) for the People's Liberation Army Navy (PLAN). The exact domestic Chinese type designation remain unknown, and this class is identified by its NATO reporting name Dukou class, or 渡口 in Chinese, meaning Crossing Wharf. The Dukou class in PLAN service is designated by a combination of two Chinese characters followed by a two-digit number. The second Chinese character is Jiao (交), short for Jiao-Tong-Ting (交通艇), meaning dispatch boat (ferry) in Chinese, because these ships are classified as dispatch boats. The first Chinese character denotes which fleet the ship is service with, with East (Dong, 东) for East Sea Fleet, North (Bei, 北) for North Sea Fleet, and South (Nan, 南) for South Sea Fleet. However, the pennant numbers are subject to change due to the change of Chinese naval ships naming convention, or when units are transferred to different fleets. As of mid 2010s, a total of five ships have been identified:

References

Auxiliary ships of the People's Liberation Army Navy
Ships of the People's Liberation Army Navy